The Waterwheel, in Eagle County, Colorado, is a historic device to lift water from the Colorado River to a height where it may be distributed for irrigation.  It was built in 1922.  It is located southeast of McCoy, Colorado at the Colorado River.  It was listed on the National Register of Historic Places in 1977, at a time when it was in deteriorated condition.  It has since been rehabilitated by the Colorado Water Restoration Foundation, Ltd.
 
It was built of jackpine logs crafted by hand tools. It lifted water  in 35 buckets around its perimeter, which emptied into a wooden trough that flowed into an irrigation ditch.

It could be raised out of the water in winter to avoid damage from ice, and lowered to appropriate level to capture the river's flow.

It is significant as the last surviving water wheel out of many once in use on the Colorado River.  It was built by Earl Brooks, a rancher, and Franklin Dixon and Jim Jones, without any formal design being available or produced.

See also
Priestly's Hydraulic Ram
Idaho Springs Water Wheel, documented in same NRHP document package

References

Water wheels
National Register of Historic Places in Eagle County, Colorado
Buildings and structures completed in 1922